Apcar may refer to
Apcar (name)
Apcar and Company a defunct Indian firm that engaged in shipping, import and export
Apcar family, an Armenian family prominent in commerce and industry
SS Arratoon Apcar, an iron-hulled steamship built in 1861

See also
Abgar (disambiguation)